Jamie the Saxt is a four act play in Scots by the Scottish dramatist, Robert McLellan, first produced by Curtain Theatre in Glasgow in 1937 with the actor Duncan Macrae in the title role. The historical subject of the comedy is the conflict between the king of Scots, James VI, and Francis Stewart, the rebellious 5th Earl of Bothwell, in the early 1590s.

Plot
The action of Jamie the Saxt, although a comedy, nevertheless follows attested events closely. McLellan sets each of the four acts at crucial dates in the historical record of the conflict between Francis Stewart, Earl of Bothwell, and the King of Scots beginning on the afternoon of the murder of James Stewart, 2nd Earl of Moray, 7 February 1591/2.

Production history
The first performance of Jamie the Saxt was at the Lyric Theatre, Glasgow, on 31 March 1937.

Scottish plays
1937 plays
1937 in Scotland
Scots-language works
Plays set in the 16th century
Plays set in Scotland
Plays based on real people
Scottish comedy
Comedy plays
Cultural depictions of James VI and I